Year 948 (CMXLVIII) was a leap year starting on Saturday (link will display the full calendar) of the Julian calendar.

Events 
 By place 

 Byzantine Empire 
 Arab–Byzantine War: Hamdanid forces under Sayf al-Dawla raid into Asia Minor. The Byzantines respond with reprisals led by Leo Phokas the Younger, taking captives and razing the walls of Hadath (modern Turkey).

 Europe  
 Two Hungarian armies invade Bavaria and Carinthia. One of them is defeated at Flozzun in the Nordgau by Henry I, duke of Bavaria.
 King Otto I appoints his son Liudolf as duke of Swabia, consolidating Ottonian dominance in Southern Germany.
 Sunifred II of Urgell dies without descendants and is succeeded by his nephew Borrell II, count of Barcelona.

 England 
 King Eadred ravages Northumbria and burns down St. Wilfrid's church at Ripon. On his way home, he sustains heavy losses at Castleford. Eadred manages to check his rivals, and the Northumbrians are forced to pay him compensation.
 St. Albans School is founded in Hertfordshire.
 Africa 
 Spring – Fatimid forces under al-Hasan ibn Ali al-Kalbi suppress the rebellion in Palermo and swiftly seize the island. Caliph al-Mansur bi-Nasr Allah appoints Ali al-Kalbi as emir of Sicily, beginning the rule of the Kalbid dynasty. 
 The Kingdom of Nri (modern Nigeria) is founded by the priest-king Eri (until 1041).

 China 
 February 12 – King Qian Hongzong is deposed by general Hu Jinsi during a coup. He establishes his younger brother Qian Chu as ruler of Wuyue.

 By topic 

 Literature 
 Minamoto no Kintada, a Japanese official and waka poet, dies. He is a respected nobleman at the imperial court and a member of the Thirty-Six Immortals of Poetry.

 Religion 
 Otto I establishes the missionary dioceses of Brandenburg and Havelberg in the territory of the Marca Geronis (Saxon Eastern March).
 The Nallur Kandaswamy temple, one of the most significant Hindu temples in the Jaffna District (modern Sri Lanka), is built.
 St Albans School in Hertfordshire is founded by Wulsin, an abbot of St Alban's Abbey, England.

Births 
 September 1 – Jing Zong, emperor of the Liao Dynasty (d. 982)
 December 22 – Gang Gam-chan, Korean official and general (d. 1031)
 Al-Shaykh Al-Mufid, Twelver Shia theologian (approximate date)
 Baba Kuhi of Shiraz, Persian Sufi mystic and writer (d. 1037)
 Emma of Italy, queen of the West Frankish Kingdom (approximate date)
 Minamoto no Yorimitsu, Japanese nobleman (d. 1021)

Deaths 
 June 15 – Romanos I, Byzantine emperor (b. c. 870)
 March 10 – Liu Zhiyuan, founder of the Later Han (b. 895)
 March 13 – Du Chongwei, Chinese general and governor
 April 28 – Hu Jinsi, Chinese general and prefect
 August 24 – Zhang Ye, Chinese general and chancellor
 November 10 – Zhao Yanshou, Chinese general and governor
 December 1 – Gao Conghui, prince and ruler of Jingnan (b. 891)
 December 12 – Li Song, Chinese official and chancellor
 Al-Qasim Guennoun, Idrisid ruler and sultan 
 Blácaire mac Gofraid, Viking king of Dublin
 Gormflaith ingen Flann Sinna, Irish queen
 Ibrahim ibn Simjur, Samanid governor
 Minamoto no Kintada, Japanese waka poet (b. 889)
 Sunifred II, count of Urgell (Spain) (b. c. 870)

References